Dow Kalleh (also known as Ḩājjī Do Kalleh) is a village in Jahanabad Rural District, in the Central District of Hirmand County, Sistan and Baluchestan Province, Iran. At the 2006 census, its population was 214, in 43 families.

References 

Populated places in Hirmand County